P. Arne K. Strid (born March 7, 1943 in Kristianstad, Sweden) is a Swedish botanist and expert on Greek flora.

Biography 
He studied botany, chemistry and genetics in the University of Lund and graduated in 1970. His doctorate was about an experimental study for the differentiation and evolution of a group of plants (Nigella arvensis complex) in the Aegean archipelago (supervisor: professor Hans Runemark) for which he also won the Jesse M. Greenman prize for the best dissertation about scientific classification of plants that year.

He was professor of botany (1973-2001) at the University of Copenhagen and distinguished visiting professor at the University of Patras, Greece (1997-1998). He was director of the Gothenburg Botanical Garden and the Natural History Museum of Göteborg (2001-2008). In 2011 he became emeritus professor at the Berlin-Dahlem Botanical Garden and Botanical Museum, in 2015 at the University of Patras, Greece and from 2017 at the National and Kapodistrian University of Athens. He is also emeritus professor at the University of Lund and the University of Copenhagen.

Besides Greece, Strid has worked and named new plant species in Turkey, Australia and South Africa.

Family 
He is married to biologist Barbro Jende Strid and they have two daughters. Together Arne and Barbro Strid edited an annotated re-issue of the Flora Graeca.

Works 

 Strid, Arne (1980). Wild flowers of Mount Olympus
 Strid, Arne (1986). Mountain Flora of Greece: Volume 1
 With Kit Tan (eds) (1991), Mountain Flora of Greece: Volume 2
 With Phitos, D.; Snogerup, S. and Greuter, W. (eds) (1995), The Red Data Book of rare and threatened plants of Greece
 With Kit Tan (eds) (1997), Flora Hellenica, Volume 1: Gymnospermae to Caryphyllaceae
 With Kit Tan (eds) (2002), Flora Hellenica, Volume 2: Nymphaeaceae to Platanaceae
 Strid, Arne (2006), Flora Hellenica Bibliography
 With Kit Tan (2009), Wildflowers of Greece
 With Strid, B. (eds) (2009, 2010, 2011, 2012, 2013), Flora Graeca Sibthorpiana. An annotated re-issue, volumes 1-10
 With Dimopoulos, P.; Raus, T.; Bergmeier, E.; Constantinidis, Th.; Iatrou, G.; Kokkini, S. and Tzanoudakis, D. (2013). Vascular plants of Greece: An annotated checklist
 Strid, Arne (2016). Atlas of the Aegean Flora
 With Erwin Bergmeier and Georgios Fotiadis (2021). Flora and Vegetation of Prespa National Park.

Eponymy 
The plant taxa Dichoropetalum stridii, Onosma stridii, Sagina stridii, Crocus biflorus subsp. stridii, Odontarrhena stridii and Astragalus stridii are named after him.

References

1943 births
Living people
20th-century Swedish botanists